This page is a glossary of archaeology, the study of the human past from material remains.

A

B

C

D

E

F

G

H

I

K

L

M

N

O

P

Q

R

S

T

U

V

W

X

Y

Z

See also 
 Outline of archaeology
 Table of years in archaeology
 Glossary of history

References

Bibliography

External links 
About.com Archaeology Glossary

Archaeology
 
 
 
Wikipedia glossaries using description lists